Margarita Nazarova may refer to:

Margarita Nazarova (artist) (1926–2005), Russian performer
Margarita Nazarova (racewalker) (born 1976), Russian race walker